Amy Marie Madigan (born September 11, 1950) is an American actress. She was nominated for the Academy Award for Best Supporting Actress for the 1985 film Twice in a Lifetime. Her other film credits include Love Child (1982), Places in the Heart (1984), Field of Dreams (1989), Uncle Buck (1989), The Dark Half (1993), Pollock (2000), and Gone Baby Gone (2007). 

Her television work includes the role of Iris Crowe on the HBO series Carnivàle (2003–2005). She won the Golden Globe Award for Best Supporting Actress on Television and was nominated for the Primetime Emmy Award for Outstanding Lead Actress in a Miniseries or a Movie for her portrayal of Sarah Weddington in the television film Roe vs. Wade (1989).

Early life
Madigan was born September 11, 1950, in Chicago to a third-generation Roman Catholic Irish American family. Her father, John J. Madigan (1918–2012), was a well-known journalist who worked for Newsweek and provided political commentary on programs such as Meet the Press and Face the Nation. He interviewed a range of political figures, from Richard Nixon to Martin Luther King Jr., and hosted his own show with WBBM (AM). Her mother was Dolores (1921–1992), an administrative assistant and amateur actress who performed in community theatre. She has two brothers, Jack and Jim.

Madigan attended Chicago's St. Aquinas Dominican High School, where she performed in school plays. In the 1960s, she studied piano at the Chicago Conservatory of Music, and went on to attend Marquette University in Milwaukee, Wisconsin, where she earned a B.A. in philosophy. She moved to Los Angeles in 1974. She later studied acting at the Lee Strasberg Theatre and Film Institute.

Career

Music
In the 1970s, Madigan pursued a career as a musician, singing lead vocals for the band Jelly, whose only album, A True Story (1977), was released by Asylum Records. She appeared in Playboy (June 1978) nude and covered in jelly, to promote her band. She toured the United States performing with several bands through the late 1970s.

Acting
In the 1980s, Madigan transitioned from a singing career to acting, and studied at the Lee Strasberg Theatre and Film Institute. Her first television role was Adele on an episode of Hart to Hart in 1981; she then had role in the television film Crazy Times. The following year, she made her film debut as Terry Jean Moore in Love Child, for which she was nominated for a Golden Globe Award for New Star of the Year – Actress. In 1983, she starred as Alison Ransom in the television film The Day After.

In 1984, she portrayed McCoy in the film Streets of Fire, and had a supporting role as Viola Kelsey in Places in the Heart. In 1985, she starred in the television film The Laundromat, written by Marsha Norman, opposite Carol Burnett. She won a CableACE Award for her performance as Deedee Johnson. She then co-starred as Glory Scheer, with her husband Ed Harris, in Alamo Bay, directed by Louis Malle. Also in 1985, she portrayed Sunny Mackenzie-Sobel in Twice in a Lifetime, for which she was nominated for the Golden Globe Award for Best Supporting Actress – Motion Picture and the Academy Award for Best Supporting Actress.

Madigan made her Off-Broadway debut in 1987, portraying Sue Jack Tiller in The Lucky Spot by Beth Henley, for which she won a Theatre World Award and was nominated for the Drama Desk Award for Outstanding Actress in a Play. In 1988, she was nominated for an Independent Spirit Award for Best Supporting Female for her performance in The Prince of Pennsylvania. That year, she performed in A Lie of the Mind at the Mark Taper Forum. In she played the wife of Kevin Costner in Field of Dreams, which was nominated for the Academy Award for Best Picture; and  played Chanice Kobolowski, the girlfriend of John Candy's character, in the John Hughes film Uncle Buck. Also in 1989, she won a Golden Globe Award for Best Supporting Actress – Series, Miniseries or Television Film and was nominated for the Primetime Emmy Award for Outstanding Lead Actress in a Miniseries or a Movie for her performance as Sarah Weddington in the television film Roe vs. Wade.

In 1990, Madigan starred opposite Paula Kelly in Stevie Wants To Play The Blues by Eduardo Machado, for which she won a Drama-Logue Award. In 1991, she starred opposite Olympia Dukakis in the Emmy-nominated television film Lucky Day. She made her Broadway debut in the role of Stella Kowalski in A Streetcar Named Desire in 1992, opposite Jessica Lange and Alec Baldwin, and was nominated for an Outer Critics Circle Award for Outstanding Debut Performance. In 1996, she and Harris produced and starred in the television film Riders of the Purple Sage. She then starred with Tilda Swinton in Female Perversions. In 1997, she was nominated for an Independent Spirit Award for Best Supporting Female for her performance as Brett Armerson in the film Loved. In 2000, she portrayed Peggy Guggenheim in the film Pollock, starring her husband, which he also directed and produced.

In 2002 she had a supporting role as Reggie Fluty, the officer who responded to aid the dying Matthew Shepard in the television film The Laramie Project.  In 2003-2005, Madigan had the supporting role of Iris Crowe/Irina, sister of villain Justin Crowe, in HBO's series Carnivále. In 2005, she starred as Lori Lansky in Winter Passing, directed by Adam Rapp. The following year, she had a supporting role as Patricia Carver, a CIA headquarters analyst, in the Emmy-winning television film The Path to 9/11. In 2007, she played the sister-in-law of Helene (Amy Ryan), Beatrice "Bea" McCready, in the film Gone Baby Gone, directed by Ben Affleck. In 2008, she played Dr. Katharine Wyatt on several episodes of ABC's medical drama series Grey's Anatomy. She then guest-starred on TNT's crime drama series Saving Grace as Gretchen Lagardi. In 2011, she guest-starred in the final episode of TNT's drama series Memphis Beat. In 2016, she starred as Halie in the revival of Sam Shepard's play Buried Child for The New Group at the Pershing Square Signature Center. It move to the West End's Trafalgar Studios in November 2016, where Madigan reprised her role.

Personal life

Madigan has been married to actor Ed Harris since November 21, 1983. They have one daughter. Madigan and Harris have been frequent collaborators during their careers.

Filmography

Film

Television

Stage

Awards and nominations

References

External links

 
 
 

1950 births
20th-century American actresses
21st-century American actresses
Actresses from Chicago
American women singers
American film actresses
American people of Irish descent
American stage actresses
American television actresses
American women film producers
American women television producers
Best Supporting Actress Golden Globe (television) winners
Catholics from Illinois
Film producers from Illinois
Lee Strasberg Theatre and Film Institute alumni
Living people
Marquette University alumni
People from Chicago
Roosevelt University alumni
Singers from Chicago
Television producers from Illinois
Theatre World Award winners